The following is a list of the mayors and leaders of the city of Port-au-Prince, Haiti.

List
 Thomas-Antoine de Mauduit du Plessis 1787-3 March 1791
 Michel-Joseph Leremboure (1720-1804) 3 March 1791 – 1792: 
 Bernard Borgella de Pensié 1792
 Paul Jean 1843 (* end of 1800 in Léogâne)
 Jules Saint Macary, 13 January 1881, magistrate of Port-au-Prince
 Sténio Vincent (1907-1909)
 Clément Magloire 1922 to 1930: prefect of Port-au-Prince under Louis Borno (born about 1880, owner of Le Matin (Haiti))
 Raphaël Brouard (1938-1940)
 Silvio Cator (1946-)
 Nélaton Camille (1952 1955)
 Windsor Kléber Laferrière (-1957)
 Jean Deeb (1960-)
 Franck Romain (-1988)
 Carmen Christophe (1988-)
 Widner Gérard Vital-Herne,  
 Irene Ridoré (-1991)
 Evans Paul (1991)
 Gerald Solomon (1991-1994)
 Evans Paul (1994-1995)
 Manno Charlemagne (1995-2000)
 Ginette Pomponneau Duperval (2000-2002)
 Rassoul Labuchin (2002-2004)
 Carline Simon (2004-2007)
 Jean Yves Jason (2007-2012)
 Municipal Commission (Gabrielle Hyacinthe, assisted in his duties by Jean-Marie Descorbettes and Junior Gérald Estimé) (2012-2012)
 Marie-Josephe René (President of the Interim Municipal Commission) (2012-2013)
 Pierre-Richard Duplan (Chairman of the Interim Municipal Commission) (2013-2016)
 Ralph Youri Chevry (2016–present)

References